Southport light rail station is a major public transport interchange in the Gold Coast suburb of Southport, the Gold Coast's CBD. The Southport light rail station and the Southport bus station (located adjacent to light rail station) provide a bus - light rail interchange for the Gold Coast central business district. The station opened in July 2014 with the introduction of the G:link light rail system.

Translink provides an integrated public transport network for the whole of South East Queensland. Surfside buslines under contract from Translink provides high frequency and suburban bus services from the Southport bus station. Buses provide connections to the surrounding suburbs. The light rail service, known as G:link runs from Broadbeach South to Helensvale via the key activity precinct Surfers Paradise.

Location 
The Southport light rail station is located centrally in the Gold Coast CBD precinct. Attractions nearby include Chinatown, Australia Fair shopping centre and the Gold Coast TAFE campus.

Below is a map of the Gold Coast CBD precinct. The station can be identified by the grey marker.{
  "type": "FeatureCollection",
  "features": [
    {
      "type": "Feature",
      "properties": {},
      "geometry": {
        "type": "Point",
        "coordinates": [
          153.41353893221822,
          -27.967868815790897
        ]
      }
    }
  ]
}

Transport Links 
Below is a list of public transport connections available from the Southport light rail and bus stations.

References

External links 

 G:link
 Translink

G:link stations
Railway stations in Australia opened in 2014
Southport, Queensland